Jon Bernson is an American singer, songwriter and recordist from San Francisco, California.

For eight years, Bernson led the indie-folk band Ray's Vast Basement and developed a multimedia approach that is frequently referred to as 'musical fiction'. Current projects include Exray's, Window Twins and THEMAYS.

Ray's Vast Basement
Early Ray's Vast Basement performances began in 1999 as a one-man show that incorporated music, sound design, video, storytelling, dance and tableau vivant. Subsequent shows added a full band that toured the United States numerous times in support of two cassette releases and three full-length CD's. Ray's Vast Basement shared the stage with many of today's leading indie folk figures, including Jolie Holland, Horsefeathers, The Mountain Goats and Thao with the Get Down Stay Down. The band contributed to a variety of compilations, most notably the Verse Press audio book Isn't It Romantic which featured Richard Buckner, Jeff Tweedy, Jason Molina and David Berman. In addition to these recording efforts, Bernson also penned a short book that details a fictional mythology behind his creations.

Exray's

Without explanation, Bernson abandoned the name Ray's Vast Basement in 2008 and adopted the Exray's moniker in collaboration with Michael Falsetto-Mapp. Exray's debut performance at SXSW was followed by a national tour and numerous unofficial live recordings. Exray's first studio recording, Ammunition Teeth, was released via cassette on October 12, 2010. The band's first LP, Exray's, was released in February, 2011. It features contributions by Nate Query from The Decemberists, Warren Huegel from Citay,  Tim Cohen from The Fresh & Onlys and Black Fiction, Dominic Cramp from Evangelista and Jason Kick from Maus Haus.

Exray's first official song "Everything Goes" appeared on Secret Seven's compilation album In a Cloud: New Sounds from San Francisco, which also includes songs by Thee Oh Sees, Kelley Stoltz, The Fresh & Onlys, Tim Cohen, Sonny and the Sunsets, The Sandwitches, Grass Widow and others.

Soundtracks

Since 2001 Bernson has written numerous soundtracks for theater and film. His most well known score is a cycle of songs written and performed for a staged version of John Steinbeck's Of Mice and Men in 2005. Two years later this music was released as a critically acclaimed album called Starvation Under Orange Trees. The Exray's song "Hesitation" was used in the soundtrack for David Fincher's major motion picture The Social Network, about the controversial founding of Facebook. Vera Freitag's 2005 film In a Steel Box also features a full soundtrack of Bernson's original music.

Window Twins

Window Twins is a collaborative group with Tim Cohen that led to an LP called I'm This Tall City in 2008. Window Twins began as a duo, but now includes Kevin E. Taylor, a multi-instrumentalist and prolific visual artist. The collaboration between Bernson and Cohen has taken other forms over a five-year period. Bernson was a member of Cohen's Black Fiction and Cohen has contributed to Ray's Vast Basement recordings since 2006.

Urban Music Program

In 1997 Bernson started the "Urban Music Program", an audio creation club for youth. Part of the Sunset Neighborhood Beacon Center in San Francisco, UMP has generated hundreds of original pieces music which have been released as a series of twenty CDR's known as Beacon Beats. Bernson's work in the UMP has also led to a series of experimental drone records under the THEMAYS moniker. KNOWFI (the debut release) was put out by Gigante Sound in 2009. The club's dedication to DJing was featured in Doug Pray's Scratch, an award-winning movie about the history of turntablism.

1924 Franklin is a Car

Since 2004 Bernson has shared a small recording studio with songwriter Michael Zapruder called "1924 Franklin is a Car". This space has been the main location for many of Bernson's recording projects and the site of many impromptu sessions with Zapruder. Other recording credits include work with Scott Pinkmountain, Black Fiction, The Lovely Public, Gene V. Baker, Anamude, P.A.F. and Raised By Spacemen.

Howells Transmitter

Bernson is a founding member of the Howells Transmitter arts collaborative and record label. Other principal members include Jennifer Welch and Colin Held. Howells Transmitter is home to a stylistically diverse group of artists: Charles Atlas, The Fresh & Onlys, Exray's, Michael Zapruder's Rain of Frogs, Black Fiction, Scott Pinkmountain, Window Twins, Ray's Vast Basement, Modular Set and contributors to the Wiretap Music Compilation. Howells Transmitter has produced numerous plays and poetry readings, in addition to its musical endeavors.

Discography
With Ray's Vast Basement

With Window Twins

With THEMAYS

With Exray's

Soundtracks

Compilations

Sound design & coordination

Production and recording

References

External links

Ray's Vast Basement on Myspace

American male singer-songwriters
Singers from San Francisco
Living people
Year of birth missing (living people)
Songwriters from San Francisco
Singer-songwriters from California